Mead School District No. 354 is a public School district serving Mead and North Spokane communities for over 100 years. Over 10,000 students attend the 15 schools in the district which consists of two high schools, an alternative high school, a STEM academy, two middle schools, eight elementary schools, and the Mead Education Partnership Program at Five Mile Prairie School House.  The school district currently has two additional schools, a middle school and elementary school under construction, slated for opening in fall 2020.  The Superintendent of the Mead School District is Shawn Woodward, who took office on July 1, 2019, replacing the retiring Dr. Tom Rockefeller who had been superintendent since 2006.

Schools

High schools

 Mead High School
 Mt. Spokane High School

Middle schools
 Highland Middle School
 Northwood Middle School
 Mountainside Middle School

Elementary schools

Brentwood Elementary School
Colbert Elementary
Creekside Elementary
Evergreen Elementary
Farwell Elementary
Meadow Ridge Elementary
Midway Elementary
Prairie View Elementary
Shiloh Hills Elementary
Skyline Elementary

Alternative schools
MEAD Alternative High School is an innovative and award winning program that affords a small community of selected students a diversity of flexible learning options.

Other schools
Five Mile Prairie School House - used by Mead Educational Partnership Program (MEPP). North Star School is affiliated with the Five Mile Prairie School and MEPP.

2004 Bond
As a result of the $37.7m bond passed by voters in 2004, the Mead School District completed numerous projects to enhance learning district-wide.  The enhancements included the installation of Multimedia LCD Projectors in every classroom in the district, wireless Internet access in classrooms, and the purchase of computer equipment.

Construction projects
Along with the passage of the 2004 bond came several construction projects.

Completed projects
Traffic safety/parking improvements at Colbert, Evergreen, and Meadow Ridge Elementary Schools
Recarpeting of Mead Education Alternative Department Alternative High School
Northwood Middle School multi-purpose room addition
Northwood Middle School, Midway Elementary School, and M.E.A.D. security system upgrades
Renovation of the Five Mile School house
Prairie View Elementary, the district's eighth elementary school.
Mountainside Middle School, the district's second middle school.

References

External links

 
School districts in Washington (state)
Education in Spokane, Washington
Public school districts in Spokane County, Washington
Educational institutions with year of establishment missing